Sam Abbott was a Grey Cup champion Canadian football player and a sailor in the Royal Canadian Navy during World War II .

Born in Montreal, Abbott played football for the St. Hyacinthe-Donnacona Navy team in 1944, winning the Grey Cup. His name is engraved on the Cup.

References 

St. Hyacinthe-Donnacona Navy football players
Anglophone Quebec people
Players of Canadian football from Quebec
Canadian football people from Montreal
Royal Canadian Navy personnel of World War II